Cattolica Airfield is an abandoned World War II military airfield in Italy, which was located in the vicinity of Cattolica (Provincia di Rimini, Emilia-Romagna); about 230 km north-northeast of Rome.  It was a temporary all-weather airfield used by the 332d Fighter Group between 4 May and 18 July 1945.

Today, part of the land on which the airfield existed is located in Santa Monica circuit of Misano Adriatico near Cattolica.

References

Further reading
 Maurer, Maurer. Air Force Combat Units of World War II. Maxwell AFB, Alabama: Office of Air Force History, 1983. 521p. .

External links

Airfields of the United States Army Air Forces in Italy
Airports established in 1944